Laurie Bolger (born Lauren Bolger, 10 July 1989) is an English poet, stand-up and presenter based in London. In 2014 she was shortlisted for Young Poet Laureate of London. She currently tours her writing including her debut collection Box Rooms, published by Burning Eye  and one woman show Talking to Strangers as well as hosting Bang Said the Gun, "London’s most raucous poetry night". She also runs "creative writing workshops in schools and youth centres most weeks".

Bolger has performed at venues such as The Royal Albert Hall, Old Vic Theatre and St Pauls Cathedral as well as being Poet in Residence in various public spaces such as libraries, community centres, pubs and the Queen Elizabeth's Olympic Park. She has performed alongside the likes of Phill Jupitus, Kae Tempest, Holly McNish and John Cooper Clarke.

Early life 
Bolger was born in London W10 and spent much of her school years on the South Coast of England with her parents and younger sister. Her grandparents lived in Wexford, Ireland and her Irish heritage features strongly in her writing. 

She says that she fell in love with poetry due to her inspiring English GCSE teacher who "made the school poetry anthology seem like a treasure chest." Bolger then went to Bath Spa University to study Creative Arts and Mary Immaculate College, Limerick to study English and Irish Literature, before moving back to London where she has lived for the past ten years and worked as a writer full-time.

Career 
Bolger's poetry had been described as "incredibly supportive and warm"  and by Phil Jupitus as  "The poet in residence of my heart". Inspired by Kae Tempest, Polar Bear, Philip Larkin“I write a lot about pubs, the old grubby London boozers[…] The old guy at the bar that’s got really good stories to tell[...]Anything with a London influence for me.”“Her voice has a kind of lilt that gives an audience the sense they are being confided in, that some sort of reality they never had a voice for was being recounted as an anecdote. And she’s funny — ‘Snoring so loud you could be sucking the paint off the walls.’ In her anti-hipster ode to the old man pub, ‘I’m drinking beer in a bar with no atmosphere…in some tarted up boozer in Shoreditch.’ She offers elegies for old London and a kind of lost authenticity.  There are lines in her set which arrest: on a breakup, she talks about ‘a look that fastens us.’ In ‘Ode to Your New Girlfriend’ which spans internet stalking, love and melancholy, watching as a distant witness to a person you used to know: ‘She’s a pop song, you’re a song people want played at their funeral…one of those songs that’s difficult to cover because there’s so much going on.” She tells stories that are relatable in their common honesty, “I’ve lost it in the veg aisle” and the entire audience is charmed, charmed utterly.” Bolger began to perform her poetry after leaving university where she toured with a punk band speaking poems at the start of gigs. She then went onto before at various events starting with Bath Lit Fest:“After leaving university I plucked up the courage to do an open mic at a pub crawl called Poems in Pubs. They ring the last orders bell and then you just get up and spit poems to the pub.”Since then she has received national airplay on the BBC Radio 1, 1Xtra and BBC Radio 3's The Verb.

Laurie was shortlisted for Young Poet Laureate of London, performing at major London venues and has also performed at festivals across the UK including Glastonbury, Camden Lock Live Festival & Lovebox, Camp Bestival, Citadel, Cheltenham Lit Fest, Kaleidoscope Festival, and Oxford Festival of the Arts. In 2014 she performed as part of the Edinburgh International Book Festival as part of Pagematch.

Bolger was part of the Voices Nationwide Campaign in 2017 featuring young and promising performance poets from the UK. She has also written for many major brands, campaigns and independent businesses globally since 2014 and was involved in Belfast Poetry Competition, officially opened by Nationwide in 2017.

Her debut collection Box Rooms was published by Burning Eye and launched at an event at The Roebuck, South London. It includes the poems Carrot Mash, Tea and Bill Bailey, Public House and Slippers.

It has been reviewed:"The collection displays extraordinary warmth and realism in it’s down to earth manner and at times feels like your conversing with a friend." These poems are a triumph in storytelling from a writer who listens, watches and writes as passionately as she perform. If I could jump into these poems I would. I imagine it’d be lovely and warm in there.’ - Hollie McNish“Moving and hilarious stories we are usually too shy to share” Marcus Davey OBE, Roundhouse“Whenever I see her perform or read her work, I’m aware that I’m in the presence of something special and vital but above all important. The Poet in Residence of my heart” Phill JupitusBolger has recently started in the world of Stand-Up.

Bolger has also worked in radio, presenting the award-winning Round @ Laurie's on Roundhouse Radio between 2014 - 2016. She describes the show "as a mixtape of stand up poets and musicians with a real focus on lyrics. I get various guests on who are doing cool things in the poetry world."

Ran and presented at:

 Wired FM Limerick, 
 Camden Community Radio,
 Hospital Radio Bedside 
 Fire 107.6 FM Bournemouth

Awards 
2014 - was shortlisted for the Young Poet Laureate of London
2015 -  she won both Best Presenter and Sound of The Roundhouse for her radio show Round @ Laurie's judged by Gemma Cairney and Roundhouse

Publications 
Box Rooms
Verse Matters
The Best Poetry Book in the World

References

Living people
English women poets
21st-century English poets
21st-century English women writers
Slam poets
1989 births
Writers from London
Alumni of Bath Spa University
20th-century English women
20th-century English people